Weekend is a British lifestyle show that aired on ITV from 26 April 2014 to 3 September 2017 and was presented by Aled Jones.

Format
Weekend featured a mixture of chat and musical guests.

Aled Jones presented the programme on Saturday and Sunday mornings. Of this appointment, Jones said "What more can I ask for than a mix of all of the things I love! It's a dream come true to present a show I've always wanted to watch and I can't wait to get started".

The show also had a feature on people with strange talents or hobbies, called 'We're Talking in the Air', a pun on "Walking in the Air", a song famously covered by Jones.

Experts

Stephen Bailey
Georgie Barrat
Lucie Cave
Tom Craine
Rhianna Dhillon 
Alison Hammond 
Boyd Hilton
James King
Patrick Monahan
David Morgan
Rebecca Perfect 
Craig Stevens
Iain Stirling
Ella Williamson

Production
Episodes of Weekend were pre-recorded at the Cactus Studios in London.

Transmissions

Regular series

Christmas specials

Episodes

Series 1

Christmas specials

Series 2

Christmas specials

Series 3

Christmas specials

Series 4

References

External links

2010s British television talk shows
2014 British television series debuts
2017 British television series endings
Breakfast television in the United Kingdom
English-language television shows
ITV Breakfast
ITV talk shows
Television series by All3Media